Ramón Quintana Bosch (born 30 August 1950) is a Spanish field hockey player. He competed at the 1972 Summer Olympics and the 1976 Summer Olympics.

Notes

References

External links
 
 
 

1950 births
Living people
Spanish male field hockey players
Olympic field hockey players of Spain
Field hockey players at the 1972 Summer Olympics
Field hockey players at the 1976 Summer Olympics
Field hockey players from Barcelona